Johnson Hill (September 21, 1890 – April 22, 1960) was an American Negro league third baseman in the 1920s.

A native of Waxahachie, Texas, Hill made his Negro leagues debut in 1910 with the Oklahoma Monarchs. He played for the Detroit Stars in 1921, then spent six seasons with the Brooklyn Royal Giants. Hill died in Amarillo, Texas in 1960 at age 69.

References

External links
 and Baseball-Reference Black Baseball stats and Seamheads

1890 births
1960 deaths
Brooklyn Royal Giants players
Detroit Stars players
Oklahoma Monarchs players
20th-century African-American sportspeople
Baseball infielders